Desire Walks On is the eleventh studio album by American rock band Heart, released on November 16, 1993, by Capitol Records. The majority of the album was co-written by lead members Ann and Nancy Wilson. It is Heart's final studio album to feature longtime member Howard Leese, who, aside from the Wilson sisters, is the band's longest-serving member. Layne Staley, lead vocalist of the Seattle grunge band Alice in Chains, sings with the Wilson sisters on the cover of Bob Dylan's "Ring Them Bells".

The album peaked at number 48 on the US Billboard 200, and on August 24, 1995, it was certified gold by the Recording Industry Association of America (RIAA), denoting shipments in excess of 500,000 copies in the United States. Desire Walks On spawned three charting singles: "Will You Be There (In the Morning)", which reached number 39 on the US Billboard Hot 100 chart, "Black on Black II" (a cover of a Dalbello song originally recorded for the 9½ Weeks film soundtrack), which peaked at number four on Billboards Mainstream Rock chart, and "The Woman in Me", which peaked at number 24 on Billboards Adult Contemporary chart.

The original 1993 European release and the 2001 US re-release were expanded to add Spanish-language versions of "The Woman in Me" and "Will You Be There (In the Morning)", the latter in a remixed format.

Track listing

Personnel
Credits adapted from the liner notes of Desire Walks On.

Heart
 Ann Wilson – lead vocals
 Nancy Wilson – acoustic and electric guitars, lead and background vocals
 Howard Leese – acoustic and electric guitars, background vocals; bass 
 Denny Carmassi – drums, percussion; sequencing

Additional musicians
 Schuyler Deale – bass
 John Purdell – keyboards, background vocals
 Dalbello – additional background vocal
 Duane Barron – additional background vocal
 Layne Staley – 3rd lead vocal 
 String section
 Ella Marie Gray – violin
 Walter Gray – cello
 Timothy Hale – viola
 Simon James – violin
 Cole Chance Steichen – bell tree

Technical
 John Purdell – production, mixing
 Duane Barron – production, engineering, mixing
 Mick Guzauski – mixing 
 Mike Shipley – mixing 
 Ed Brooks, Gregor Visconty, Tom McGurk, Todd Lehmkuhl – engineering assistance
 Don Grierson – executive production
 George Marino – mastering at Sterling Sound (New York City)

Artwork
 Tommy Steele – art direction
 Jeff Fey – design
 Scott Morgan – photography

Charts

Certifications

References

1993 albums
Albums produced by Duane Baron
Albums produced by John Purdell
Capitol Records albums
Heart (band) albums